Hult is a surname of Swedish.

Geographical distribution
As of 2014, 60.8% of all known bearers of the surname Hult were residents of Sweden (frequency 1:3,000), 26.2% of the United States (1:254,941), 4.6% of Finland (1:22,164), 4.2% of Norway (1:22,456), 1.4% of Denmark (1:72,366) and 1.1% of Canada (1:645,579).

In Sweden, the frequency of the surname was higher than national average (1:3,000) in the following counties:
 1. Värmland County (1:1,211)
 2. Kalmar County (1:1,555)
 3. Kronoberg County (1:1,569)
 4. Gotland County (1:1,828)
 5. Jönköping County (1:1,849)
 6. Västra Götaland County (1:2,464)
 7. Blekinge County (1:2,609)
 8. Dalarna County (1:2,665)
 9. Södermanland County (1:2,792)
 10. Skåne County (1:2,897)

In Finland, the frequency of the surname was higher than national average (1:22,164) in the following regions:
 1. Central Finland (1:8,638)
 2. Uusimaa (1:13,561)
 3. Kymenlaakso (1:14,242)
 4. Pirkanmaa (1:14,987)
 5. Tavastia Proper (1:15,195)
 6. Ostrobothnia (1:17,380)
 7. South Karelia (1:18,028)

In Norway, the frequency of the surname was higher than national average (1:22,456) only in one region: Western Norway (1:10,681).

Notable people
 Bertil Hult (born 1941), Swedish businessman; Hult International Business School is named for him
 Emma Hult (born 1988), Swedish politician
 Karl Hult (born 1944), Swedish biochemist and researcher 
 Karl-Erik Hult (1936–2010), Swedish footballer and manager
 Nils Hult (born 1939), commissioner who helped create the Hult Center for the Performing Arts, in Eugene, Oregon, US
 Ragnar Hult (1857–1899), Finnish botanist and plant geographer
Tina Signesdottir Hult (born 1982), Norwegian photographer
Barbara Hult Lekberg (1925–2018), American metal sculptor

See also
 Johan Hultin (born 1924), Swedish-American pathologist

References

Swedish-language surnames